Wesley G. Evans Jr. (January 28, 1844 - September 3, 1921) was a Mississippi politician and Democratic state legislator from Harrison County in the late 19th and early 20th centuries.

Biography 
He was born on January 28, 1844, in Mississippi City, Mississippi. He was the son of W. G. Evans Sr. and his wife, Lucetta (Woodruff) Evans. He fought in the Confederate Army in the American Civil War. He was a lawyer by profession. He represented Harrison County in the Mississippi House of Representatives from 1890 to 1892. He was a member of the Mississippi State Senate from 1900 to 1904, representing the 1st District, consisting of Mississippi's Hancock, Harrison, and Jackson counties. He died on September 3, 1921, in his residence in Gulfport, Mississippi.

Personal life 
Evans was married to Susan Carter. They had a son named Thomas Marshall Evans, who was born in 1862 and later became a lawyer in Gulfport.

References 

1844 births
1921 deaths
Democratic Party Mississippi state senators
Democratic Party members of the Mississippi House of Representatives
People from Gulfport, Mississippi